Port Pirie Junction railway station was located in the city of Port Pirie.

History
Port Pirie Junction station opened on 23 July 1937 when the Commonwealth Railways standard gauge Trans-Australian Railway was extended south from Port Augusta, and the South Australian Railways line broad gauge north from Redhill to a new break of gauge station in the Port Pirie suburb of Solomontown.

On 12 November 1967, it was replaced by Port Pirie (Mary Elie Street) station and later demolished.

References

Disused railway stations in South Australia
Railway stations in Australia opened in 1937
Railway stations closed in 1967
Port Pirie
1967 disestablishments in Australia